The mangrove robin (Peneothello pulverulenta) is a passerine bird in the family Petroicidae.  It is found in the Aru Islands, New Guinea, and northern Australia.  The bird's common name refers to its natural habitat.  They live in mangrove forests and seldom fly outside these biomes.

Taxonomy
The mangrove robin was described by the French naturalist Charles Lucien Bonaparte in 1850 from a specimen collected in New Guinea. He coined the binomial name Myiolestes pulverulentus. The species was subsequently moved to the genus Peneoenanthe by the Australian ornithologist Gregory Mathews. It is now placed in the genus Peneothello, based on the results of a molecular phylogenetic study of the family Petroicidae, published in 2011.

There are four subspecies.
 P. p. pulverulenta (Bonaparte, 1850) – coastal New Guinea
 P. p. leucura (Gould, 1869) – Aru Islands  (south west of New Guinea), northeast coast of Australia
 P. p. alligator (Mathews, 1912) – coastal northern Australia and nearby islands
 P. p. cinereiceps (Hartert, 1905) – northwest coast of Australia

Description

They feature a "dull pale bar" at the bottom of their remiges, although this is not very noticeable. In order to facilitate their navigation through thick mangrove forests, mangrove robins have developed wings and tails that are rounded.

Distribution and habitat
The bird is found in the Northern Australia region and the island of New Guinea, within the countries of Australia, Indonesia, and Papua New Guinea.  Their preferred habitat are tropical and subtropical mangrove forests located above the level of high tide.  They seldom travel outside their habitat.

The mangrove robin has been placed in the least Concern category of the IUCN Red List, as the population has remained stable throughout the last ten years.

Behaviour
The call of the mangrove robin has been described as a "down-slurred whistle".  It eats insects in the mud when the tide falls.  While these may be its primary prey, the mangrove robin also consumes a significant amount of crab in its diet.

References

External links

Xeno-canto: audio recordings of the mangrove robin

mangrove robin
mangrove robin
Birds of the Aru Islands
Birds of Western Australia
Birds of the Northern Territory
Birds of Queensland
mangrove robin
mangrove robin
Taxonomy articles created by Polbot
Taxobox binomials not recognized by IUCN